Chapter One is the debut studio album released by Australian electronic group Future Sound of Melbourne (styled as FSOM). At the ARIA Music Awards of 1996, the album won the ARIA Award for Best Dance Release

Track listing 
 "The Groove" - 2:04
 "Flashflood" - 5:32
 "Equinox" - 5:24
 "Chapter One" - 5:39
 "System X - 4:47
 "Lunar Eclipse" - 6:50
 "Antichrist" - 2:52

References 

1995 albums
ARIA Award-winning albums